Andriy Mykolayovych Shevchenko, or Andrii Mykolaiovych Shevchenko (born 29 September 1976) is a Ukrainian football manager, a former professional football player and a former politician. Shevchenko played as a striker for Dynamo Kyiv, A.C. Milan, Chelsea and the Ukraine national team. He was most recently head coach of Serie A club Genoa.

Shevchenko is considered one of the most lethal strikers to ever play the game. He is ranked as the seventh top goalscorer in all European competitions with 67 goals. With a tally of 175 goals scored for Milan, he is the second most prolific player in the history of the club, and is also the all-time top scorer of the Derby della Madonnina (the derby between Milan and their local rivals Inter Milan) with 14 goals. Furthermore, he is the all-time top scorer for the Ukraine national team with 48 goals.

Shevchenko's career has been highlighted by many awards, the most prestigious of which was the Ballon d'Or in 2004 (becoming the third Ukrainian, after Oleg Blokhin and Igor Belanov, to receive it). He won the UEFA Champions League in 2003 with Milan, and he has also won various league and cup titles in Ukraine, Italy and England. He was also a Champions League runner-up in 2005 and 2008. He was named in the FIFA World XI for 2005. In 2004, he was named as one of the Top 100 greatest living footballers as part of FIFA's 100th anniversary celebration.

In his international career, the striker led Ukraine as captain to the quarter-finals in their first ever FIFA World Cup appearance in 2006, and also took part at UEFA Euro 2012 on home soil. Quitting football for politics in 2012,, he stood for election to the Ukrainian Parliament in the October 2012 Ukrainian parliamentary election, but his party failed to win parliamentary representation. He returned to football in 2016, as assistant coach of the Ukraine national team February to July, at the time led by Mykhaylo Fomenko. In July 2016, Shevchenko was appointed Ukraine's head coach, and led the nation to the quarter-finals at UEFA Euro 2020. Shevchenko became the Vice President of the National Olympic Committee of Ukraine on 17 November 2022. He left the National Olympic Committee in January 2023 due to disagreement with the results of the election of its new President Vadym Gutzeit.

Early life
Shevchenko was born in Dvirkivshchyna, Ukrainian SSR. He was born in the family of Praporshchik Mykola Hryhorovych Shevchenko. In 1979, his family moved to the newly built neighbourhood in Kyiv – Obolon (Minsk District was created in 1975). In Kyiv, Shevchenko went to the 216th City School and in 1986 (aged 9) enrolled into the football section coached by Oleksandr Shpakov. Because of the accident at the Chernobyl Nuclear Power Plant, together with his sport group he was evacuated temporarily from the city. At an early age, he also was a competitive boxer in the LLWI Ukrainian junior league, but eventually he elected to move on to football.

Club career

Dynamo Kyiv
In 1986, Shevchenko failed a dribbling test for entrance to a specialist sports school in Kyiv, but happened to catch the eye of a Dynamo Kyiv scout while playing in a youth tournament, and was thus brought to the club. Four years later, Shevchenko was on the Dynamo under-14 team for the Ian Rush Cup (now the Welsh Super Cup); he finished as the tournament's top scorer and was awarded a pair of Rush's boots as a prize by the then-Liverpool player.

Shevchenko started out his professional career at age 16 when he came on for only 12 minutes as a substitute in a 0–2 home loss to the Odessa second team Chornomorets-2 Odesa on 5 May 1993. He was a substitute for the last six home games of the 1992–93 Ukrainian First League and did not score any goals. The next 1993–94 season at the second tier, Shevchenko was the top goal scorer for Dynamo-2 with 12 goals, and he made his first appearance in the starting XI. Shevchenko scored his first goal against Krystal Chortkiv at the home 1–1 draw on 7 October 1993. During the same season, he recorded his first hat-trick in a home game against Artania Ochakiv on 21 November 1993 which Dynamo-2 won 4–1. Shevchenko stayed with Dynamo-2 until the end of 1994 and once again he was called up for one game in late 1996.

He made his Vyshcha Liha debut for Dynamo squad on 8 November 1994 in an away game against Shakhtar Donetsk when he was 18. It was actually his second game for the senior squad overall after he played a home game of National Cup competition on 5 November 1994 against Skala Stryi. That year Shevchenko became a national champion and became a cup holder with Dynamo. He won his second league title the next season, scoring 6 goals in 20 matches. He scored a hat-trick in the first half of a 1997–98 UEFA Champions League away match against Barcelona, which Dynamo won 4–0; no other visitor to the Camp Nou scored a Champions League treble until 2021. His 19 goals in 23 league matches and six goals in ten Champions League matches (including a hat-trick over two legs against Real Madrid) were followed by 28 total goals in all competitions in 1998–99. He won the domestic league title with Dynamo in each of his five seasons with the club.

AC Milan
In 1999, Shevchenko joined Italian club AC Milan for a then-record transfer fee of $25 million. He made his league debut on 28 August 1999 in a 2–2 draw with Lecce. Alongside five other players – Michel Platini, John Charles, Gunnar Nordahl, István Nyers, and Ferenc Hirzer – he managed, as a foreign player, to win the Serie A scoring title in his debut season, finishing with 24 goals in 32 matches. Shevchenko maintained his excellent form into the 2000–01 season, scoring 24 goals in 34 matches, including nine goals in 14 Champions League games. During the same season, he also reunited with Kakha Kaladze as teammates when Milan signed the Georgian defender from Dynamo Kyiv in January 2001.

Despite netting only five times in 24 matches, mainly due to injuries, Shevchenko became the first Ukrainian-born player to win the Champions League after Milan lifted their sixth trophy in 2002–03. He scored the crucial away goal against rivals Inter Milan in the semi-final, and then scored the winning penalty in the shoot out against Juventus in the final, which had ended goalless after extra time. Following Milan winning the Champions League, Shevchenko flew to Kyiv to put his medal by the grave of Valeriy Lobanovskyi (who he was managed by when he was at Dynamo), who died in 2002. He finished top goalscorer in Serie A in 2003–04 for the second time in his career, scoring 24 goals in 32 matches as Milan won the Scudetto for the first time in five years. He also scored the winning goal in the UEFA Super Cup victory over Porto, leading to Milan's second trophy of the season. In August 2004, he scored three goals against Lazio as Milan won the Supercoppa Italiana. Shevchenko capped off the year by being awarded the 2004 Ballon d'Or, becoming the third Ukrainian player ever to win the award after Oleg Blokhin and Igor Belanov. In the same year, Shevchenko was also inducted into the FIFA 100.

He scored 17 goals in the 2004–05 season after missing several games with a fractured cheekbone. Shevchenko made Champions League history the following season; on 23 November 2005, he scored all four goals in Milan's 4–0 group stage drubbing of Fenerbahçe, becoming only the fifth player to accomplish this feat; his company includes Marco van Basten, Simone Inzaghi, Dado Pršo and Ruud van Nistelrooy (while Lionel Messi joined that group in the 2009–10 season and Robert Lewandowski in 2012–13 and 2019–20), and Shevchenko was the only player to have done it in an away game until Olivier Giroud did so for Chelsea, away to Sevilla, in the 2020-21 season. Milan eventually lost the tournament when Shevchenko missed the crucial penalty in the final against Liverpool. In the 2005–06 Champions League, he scored his last Milan goal in the second leg of the quarter-final as they eliminated Lyon after a last-minute comeback in a 3–1 victory. In the semi-final, Milan lost to eventual winners Barcelona 1–0, a match where Shevchenko controversially had a last minute equaliser denied by the referee. Despite this, he still ended up being the top scorer of the whole competition with 9 goals in 12 games.

On 8 February 2006, Shevchenko became Milan's second highest all-time goalscorer, behind Gunnar Nordahl, after netting against Treviso. He finished the season as joint fourth-top scorer with 19 goals in 28 games. Shevchenko ended his seven-year stint with Milan with 175 goals in 296 games.

Chelsea
During the summer of 2005, there were persistent reports that Chelsea owner Roman Abramovich offered a record sum €73 million and striker Hernán Crespo to Milan in exchange for Shevchenko. Milan refused the monetary offer but took Crespo on loan. Chelsea chief executive Peter Kenyon was quoted as saying, "I think Shevchenko is the type of player we would like. At the end of the day to improve what we have got, it has to be a great player and Shevchenko certainly comes into that class." Shevchenko cited that the persistence of Abramovich was a key factor in his move. Milan, desperate to keep the striker, offered Shevchenko a six-year contract extension.

On 28 May 2006, Shevchenko left Milan for Chelsea for £30.8 million (€43.875million), topping Michael Essien's transfer fee from the previous year and also breaking the record for a player signed by an English club. He received the number seven shirt, as Chelsea manager José Mourinho said that Shevchenko could continue wearing it.

Shevchenko made his debut for Chelsea on 13 August 2006 in the FA Community Shield, scoring his side's goal in a 2–1 loss to Liverpool. On 23 August, he scored his first Premier League goal – and his 300th in top-flight and international football – in a 2–1 loss to Middlesbrough. He scored goals sporadically throughout the season, including equalisers against Porto and Valencia in the 2006–07 Champions League and another against London rival club Tottenham Hotspur in the FA Cup to help take his side into the semi-final. He finished with a total of 14 from 51 games. During the campaign, he netted his 57th career goal in European competitions, leaving him second behind Gerd Müller on the all-time European goalscorers list, before Filippo Inzaghi made the record his own in the 2007–08 Champions League. Shevchenko's 2006–07 season was cut short due to injury and a hernia operation. He missed the Champions League semi-final against Liverpool and the FA Cup final against Manchester United at the new Wembley Stadium on 19 May 2007. He did, however, start for Chelsea in the 2007 League Cup final victory over Arsenal in which he hit the bar which would have given Chelsea a 3–1 lead.{}

Shevchenko was handed his first start of the 2007–08 season against Blackburn Rovers at home to cover for the injured Didier Drogba, but the game finished goalless. His first goal of the season came three days later, equalising for Chelsea in a match against Rosenborg, which turned out to be José Mourinho's last game as manager of Chelsea. Throughout the season, Shevchenko was in and out of the starting line-up because of injuries and the appointment of Avram Grant following the departure of Mourinho. During the Christmas period, however, Shevchenko enjoyed a good run of form. He scored the first goal in Chelsea's 2–0 win over Sunderland, and he was named man of the match in Chelsea's 4–4 draw against Aston Villa at Stamford Bridge, scoring twice (including a stunning 25-yard shot into the top left hand corner) and assisting Alex to make the score 3–2 in Chelsea's favour. Shevchenko scored his last goal in the 2007–08 season in a 1–1 draw with Bolton Wanderers. He finished the season with five league goals in 17 games. Shevchenko also played a part in a pre-season match which was against his former team, Milan.

Loan to AC Milan
Shevchenko was not used very often in the starting line-up at Chelsea, and with the appointment of Luiz Felipe Scolari, he was deemed surplus to requirements. Due to this, Milan vice-president Adriano Galliani offered to take Shevchenko back to the San Siro and Shevchenko was loaned back to his old club for the 2008–09 season.

Shevchenko's failed to score any league goals and only scored 2 goals in 26 appearances, starting only nine of those games. He returned to Chelsea for the final year of his four-year contract, where he was joined by his former Milan manager Carlo Ancelotti.

Departure 
Shevchenko was not even on the bench for Chelsea's penalty shoot-out victory over Manchester United at Wembley at the weekend in the season-opening Community Shield. After making a late appearance for Chelsea in their second game of the 2009–10 season, Ancelotti announced that Shevchenko would be likely to leave Chelsea before the summer transfer window closed. Despite this, Ancelotti said it had nothing to do with his decision to leave Shevchenko out of Chelsea's 2009–10 Champions League squad, but just to continue playing first-team football.

Return to Dynamo Kyiv

On 28 August 2009, Shevchenko signed a two-year deal at his former club Dynamo Kyiv and scored a penalty-goal in his first game upon returning to his former club against Metalurh Donetsk in Dynamo's 3–1 victory on 31 August. He was mostly used as a left winger and central mid-fielder, and was named left winger in the 2009 team of the season. On 16 September, Shevchenko played his first Champions League match after returning to Dynamo, against Rubin Kazan, in Dynamo's first game of the 2009–10 season. In October, he was named the best player of the Ukrainian Premier League. On 4 November, he scored a goal in the game against Inter, cross-city rivals of his former club Milan, in the fourth game of the Champions League season. It was the 15th goal he had scored against Inter in his career.

On 28 July 2012, Shevchenko announced that he was quitting football for politics.

International career
Shevchenko achieved 111 caps and scored 48 goals for the Ukraine national team, whom he represented at the 2006 FIFA World Cup and UEFA Euro 2012. He earned his first cap in 1995 and scored his first international goal in May 1996 in a friendly against Turkey.

During qualification for the 1998 World Cup, Shevchenko scored three times as Ukraine finished second in Group G to earn a place in the play-offs. Ukraine were knocked out 3–1 on aggregate by Croatia, the team who would go on to finish third in the finals, with Shevchenko scoring Ukraine's goal in the home leg.

Ukraine performed similarly impressively in UEFA Euro 2000 qualifying, again making the play-offs after finishing one point behind World Champions France in Group 4. However, the team again failed at the play-off stage, losing to underdogs Slovenia. Overall, Shevchenko scored four times for Ukraine during their Euro 2000 qualifying campaign.

In March 2000, Dynamo manager Valeri Lobanovsky became Ukraine's coach, with the aim to qualify for the 2002 World Cup finals. Shevchenko scored ten goals in the qualifiers, but Ukraine again failed to qualify after losing a play-off, this time against Germany. He then scored a total of three goals in Ukraine's Euro 2004 qualifying round, but the team failed to qualify for the play-offs, finishing below Greece and Spain in third place in Group 6.

Shevchenko scored six goals in qualifying for the 2006 World Cup, to take his country to its first ever major tournament. He captained the team at the finals and scored in Ukraine's first ever World Cup win, a 4–0 defeat of Saudi Arabia. He then scored the winning goal from a penalty kick as Ukraine beat Tunisia 1–0 to qualify for the second round where, despite Shevchenko failing with their first kick, Ukraine knocked out Switzerland on penalties. Ukraine were then beaten 3–0 by eventual champions Italy at the quarter-final stage.

After only playing two games for Milan in the 2008–09 season, Shevcehnko was still the first choice for Ukraine, and he scored an equaliser in an 2010 World Cup qualifying match against England at Wembley Stadium. Ukraine, however, went on to lose the game 2–1 after his former Chelsea teammate John Terry scored from a free kick delivered by David Beckham.

In a 21 December 2009 interview with UEFA, Shevchenko declared that he was keen to play in his home country at Euro 2012. "After a disappointing 2010 World Cup qualifying campaign, that is my new challenge, or even dream. I will do everything to achieve that." In May 2012, Shevchenko was named in the Ukrainian squad for Euro 2012. In Ukraine's opening game, Shevchenko scored two headers to beat Sweden 2–1 in Group D.  After his country was eliminated from the group, Shevchenko announced he would retire from international football, having been Ukraine's youngest and oldest goalscorer and record marksman with 48 goals in 111 appearances.

Style of play

A fast, hardworking, energetic, and well-rounded striker, Shevchenko was a prolific and highly opportunistic goalscorer, who was usually deployed as an out-and-out striker in a centre-forward role, although he was capable of operating anywhere along the front line, and often played in a free role, in which he could attack from the left wing, and get past opposing defenders with his runs into the penalty area, courtesy of his pace and movement off the ball. He also occupied a wider position as an outright winger on the left flank at times, in particular at the beginning of his career, and also during his second stint with Dynamo Kyiv during his later years; he was also capable of playing on the right. Shevchenko was also effective from set-pieces, and was an accurate penalty taker. A strong and physical striker with an eye for goal, he was primarily known for his excellent positional sense, movement off the ball, and finishing ability inside the box, as well as his composure in front of goal; moreover, he possessed a powerful and accurate shot with either foot, from both inside and outside the area. Although he was not known to take part in aerial duels frequently, he was also good in the air, due to his heading ability. Often compared by pundits to fellow former Milan striker Marco van Basten, although he was not as elegant as the Dutch forward, he also possessed good technique; furthermore, despite mainly being a goalscorer, he was capable of playing off of his teammates, in addition to scoring goals himself, due to his link-up play.

Coaching and managerial career

Ukraine national team
In November 2012, Shevchenko initially refused to accept Football Federation of Ukraine's proposal to become head coach of the Ukraine national team.

From 16 February to 15 July 2016, Shevchenko served as the assistant manager of the Ukraine national team. On 15 July 2016, Shevchenko was appointed as manager of the Ukraine national team. The 39-year-old replaced Mykhaylo Fomenko, whose four-year spell ended with elimination at the group stage of Euro 2016. He signed a two-year contract with the possibility of another two-year extension. Former Italy and Milan defender Mauro Tassotti, who was assistant coach when Shevchenko was at Milan, joined his coaching staff, as did former Dynamo coach Raúl Riancho, and former AC Milan Youth System coach Andrea Maldera. On 14 October 2019, Shevchenko led Ukraine to qualify for Euro 2020 with a 2–1 home win over reigning European champions Portugal.

At UEFA Euro 2020, Shevchenko led Ukraine to reach the quarter-finals of the European Championship for the first time in their history. His side finished as one of the four best third-placed teams in the group stage, then beating Sweden in extra time in the round of 16 and suffering an exit to England in the next round. Despite Ukraine’s successful tournament, on 1 August 2021, he announced his departure from the post.

Genoa
On 7 November 2021, Shevchenko was announced as the new head coach of Serie A side Genoa, following the club's takeover by US investment firm 777 Partners, replacing Davide Ballardini. He signed a contract until 2024 for the 18th-placed team who had won once in 12 games. Two weeks later, he lost 2–0 on his debut at home to Roma, managed by his former Chelsea boss José Mourinho. On 15 January 2022, Shevchenko was sacked after two months having won just one match and lost seven during the time.

Political career

In the late 1990s, Shevchenko and other teammates of Dynamo Kyiv publicly backed the Social Democratic Party of Ukraine (united), whose members were the club's then-owner and president Hryhoriy Surkis and then-vice president Viktor Medvedchuk.

After his retirement in June 2012, Shevchenko immediately joined Ukraine – Forward! (formerly known as Ukrainian Social Democratic Party) and took second place on the party list for the October 2012 Ukrainian parliamentary election. This was in spite of him stating a month earlier that he wanted to coach after his playing career: "This is the world I understand, the world I want to stay in." In the election his party won 1.58% of the national votes and no constituencies and thus failed to win parliamentary representation.

National Olympic Committee of Ukraine
Shevchenko became the Vice President of the National Olympic Committee of Ukraine on 17 November 2022. He left the National Olympic Committee in January 2023 due to disagreement with the results of the election of its new President Vadym Gutzeit.

Personal life

Shevchenko's first name ( in Ukrainian) has multiple ways of being transliterated from its original spelling in the Ukrainian Cyrillic alphabet into the Latin alphabet; Andriy is the spelling used throughout the player's official web site. It has also been adopted by UEFA and FIFA and is the preferred spelling in most English publications.

Shevchenko is married to American model Kristen Pazik. The couple met at a Giorgio Armani afterparty in 2002, and married on 14 July 2004 in a private ceremony on a golf course in Washington, D.C. As of 2006, the couple communicated in Italian as he did not speak English and she did not speak Ukrainian. After his return to Dynamo Kyiv in August 2009, the couple declared that they want their children to learn Ukrainian.

The couple have four sons: Jordan, born on 29 October 2004, Kristian, born on 10 November 2006, Alexander, born on 1 October 2012 and Rider Gabriel, born on 6 April 2014. Shevchenko commemorated Jordan's birth by scoring against Sampdoria the following day (Milan won 1–0). Milan owner and former Prime Minister of Italy Silvio Berlusconi is the godfather of Shevchenko's first son, Jordan. The day after Kristian's birth, Shevchenko scored in a 4–0 Chelsea victory over Watford and he and several of his teammates gathered and performed the popular "rock-the-baby" goal celebration as a tribute.

Shevchenko is a close friend of fashion designer Giorgio Armani, and has modelled for Armani and opened two boutiques with him in Kyiv. With his wife, he has started an e-commerce Web site called Ikkon.com, dedicated to men's fashion and lifestyle.

In June 2005, he became an ambassador for the SOS Children's Villages charity. Shevchenko also has a foundation to support orphaned children.

Shevchenko, an avid golfer, participated in his first professional golf tournament, the Kharkov Superior Cup, in September 2013.

Shevchenko represented the Rest of the World team against England for Soccer Aid on 8 June 2014.

Besides his native Russian, Shevchenko also speaks English, Italian and to some extent Ukrainian. He has said that he is working to improve his Ukrainian.

Shevchenko has appealed for an end to the War in Ukraine and the Invasion of Ukraine.

Media
Shevchenko features in EA Sports' FIFA video game series; he was on the cover of FIFA 2005, and was introduced as one of the Ultimate Team Legends in FIFA 14 and has been an Ultimate Team Legend in every FIFA game since.

Career statistics

Club
Source:

International

Managerial statistics

Honours

Dynamo Kyiv
Vyshcha Liha: 1994–95, 1995–96, 1996–97, 1997–98, 1998–99
Ukrainian Cup: 1995–96, 1997–98, 1998–99
Ukrainian Super Cup: 2011
Commonwealth of Independent States Cup: 1996, 1997, 1998

AC Milan
Serie A: 2003–04
Coppa Italia: 2002–03
Supercoppa Italiana: 2004
UEFA Champions League: 2002–03; runner-up: 2004–05
UEFA Super Cup: 2003

Chelsea
FA Cup: 2006–07
Football League Cup: 2006–07
UEFA Champions League: runner-up: 2007–08

Individual
Ballon d'Or: 2004
Ukrainian Footballer of the Year: 1997, 1999, 2000, 2001, 2004, 2005
CIS Cup top goalscorer: 1997 (shared)
CIS Cup Team of the Competition: 1997
Vyscha Liha Footballer of the Year: 1997
UEFA Champions League top scorer: 1999 (8 goals)
ESM Team of the Year: 1999–2000, 2003–04, 2004–05
UEFA Club Forward of the Year: 1998–99
UEFA Team of the Year: 2004, 2005
Serie A Foreign Footballer of the Year: 2000 
Serie A top scorer: 1999-00 (24 goals), 2003–04 (24 goals)
Serie A Goal of the Year: 2004
Baltic and Commonwealth of Independent States Footballer of the Year: 2004, 2005
Golden Foot: 2005
FIFPro World XI: 2005
FIFA 100
AC Milan Hall of Fame
Pallone d'Argento: 2003–04 
L'Équipe Team of the Year: 2004, 2005.
World Soccer's 100 Greatest Players of the 20th Century

Orders
  Hero of Ukraine: 2004
  Commendatore dell'Ordine della Stella d'Italia: 2018

See also 
 List of footballers with 100 or more UEFA Champions League appearances
 List of top international men's football goalscorers by country
 List of men's footballers with 100 or more international caps

References

External links

1976 births
Living people
People from Kyiv Oblast
Ukrainian footballers
Ukraine youth international footballers
Ukraine under-21 international footballers
Ukraine international footballers
Association football forwards
FC Dynamo-2 Kyiv players
FC Dynamo Kyiv players
A.C. Milan players
Chelsea F.C. players
Ukrainian First League players
Ukrainian Premier League players
Serie A players
Premier League players
Ukrainian Cup top scorers
Ukrainian Premier League top scorers
FIFA 100
UEFA Champions League winning players
UEFA Champions League top scorers
Ballon d'Or winners
2006 FIFA World Cup players
UEFA Euro 2012 players
FIFA Century Club
Ukrainian expatriate footballers
Expatriate footballers in England
Expatriate footballers in Italy
Ukrainian expatriate sportspeople in England
Ukrainian expatriate sportspeople in Italy
Ukrainian football managers
Ukrainian expatriate football managers
Expatriate football managers in Italy
Ukraine national football team managers
Genoa C.F.C. managers
UEFA Euro 2020 managers
Serie A managers
Ukraine – Forward! politicians
Ukrainian sportsperson-politicians
Recipients of the title of Hero of Ukraine
Association football coaches